Lazzarini is an Italian surname. Notable people with the surname include:

 Adolfo Lazzarini (1952–2010), Paraguayan footballer
 Alice Lazzarini, American scientist, author, and researcher on neurogenetic disorders
 Arianna Lazzarini (born 1976), Italian politician
 Bert Lazzarini (1884–1952), Australian politician
 Carlo Lazzarini (1880–1952), Australian politician
 Emanuel Lazzarini (born 1987), Argentine footballer
 Eugenio Lazzarini (born 1945), Italian motorcyclist
 Giovanni Andrea Lazzarini (1710–1801), Italian painter
 Giulia Lazzarini (born 1934), Italian actress
 Giulio Lazzarini (1927–2020), Italian politician
 Gregorio Lazzarini (1657–1730), Italian painter
 Isabella Lazzarini, Italian historian
 Jorge-Emilio Lazzarini (born 1955), Argentine alpine skier
 Nick Lazzarini (born 1984), American dancer
 Philippe Lazzarini (born 1964), Swiss-Italian diplomat
 Pietro Lazzarini (1842–1918), Italian sculptor
 Robert Lazzarini (born 1965), American artist
 Roberto Lazzarini (born 1961), Brazilian fencer
 Victor Lazzarini (born 1969), Brazilian-Irish composer

Italian-language surnames
it:Lazzaretti